Steven Bryce Valerio (born August 16, 1977) is a Costa Rican former footballer. Bryce was well known throughout his career for his versatility, playing as an attacking midfielder, winger, striker or right back, as needed; and possessing good skills, pace, and strength.

Club career
Bryce began his career in the Costa Rican first division on loan from Deportivo Saprissa with AD Goicoechea, making his debut on September 22, 1996 against Herediano.  After that he played for Deportivo Saprissa and Liga Deportiva Alajuelense whom he joined in August 2000. In his 9 years in Costa Rica, Bryce won 6 national championships, in 1997-98, 1998–99, 2000–01, 2001–02, 2002–03 and 2003-04.  In addition, he won a CONCACAF Champions' Cup in 2004.

After his tenure with Alajuelense, he went to play with Anorthosis of the Cypriot First Division and OFI Crete of the Greek Super League. He came back to America after a couple of unsuccessful season in Europe and was signed by Brujas, a new club in his native Costa Rica owned by a local magnate. Six months later he decided to move to Marathón in Honduras and then to F.C. Motagua. He never found his form and game in Honduras and by the end of his contract with F.C. Motagua, he suffered and injury that took him out of the fields for almost a year. He signed for Liga Deportiva Alajuelense and started his recovery but did not make it to the pitch one game and was released in summer 2008. In the 2009-2010 season, Bryce was called up by Universidad de Costa Rica a team that desperatively needed players with experience, but again, he never found his form and was released after a few months.

In January 2010, Bryce signed a 1-year deal with Brisbane Roar, but the story repeated itself and just after a few games he decided to put an end on his contract and definitively retire from football.

International career
At junior level, Bryce played in 1997 FIFA World Youth Championship held in Malaysia, playing in all three of the team's matches, scoring once against Paraguay.

He made his debut for the senior national team in a January 1998 friendly match against Honduras and collected a total of 73 caps, scoring 9 goals. He has represented his country in 18 FIFA World Cup qualification matches. and played at the 1999 and 2003 UNCAF Nations Cups as well as at the 2002, 2003 and 2005 CONCACAF Gold Cups and the 2001 and 2004 Copa América.

Most notably however, he represented Costa Rica in the 2002 World Cup, playing in all three of the team's matches, and assisting on one goal against each of Brazil and Turkey.

He also was a non-playing squad member at the 2000 CONCACAF Gold Cup.

He played his final international in a July 2005 CONCACAF Gold Cup match against Honduras.

International goals
Scores and results list Costa Rica's goal tally first.

Personal life
He is a son of Eustace Bryce and Mildred Valerio, with whom he lived in Canada in 1991 and 1992. He is married to Cristina Páez. They have a daughter, Sarah, and a son, Samuel.

Honours
With Costa Rica:
 UNCAF Nations Cup: 1999, 2005
With Deportivo Saprissa:
 Primera División de Costa Rica: 1997-98, 1998–99
With Liga Deportiva Alajuelense:
 Primera División de Costa Rica: 2000-01, 2001–02, 2002–03, 2004–05
 CONCACAF Champions' Cup: 2004
 Copa Interclubes UNCAF: 2002
 Copa LG Uncaf (Panama) Champions: 2000
With F.C. Motagua:
 UNCAF Interclub Cup: 2007

References

External links
 
 2002 World Cup profile - Nación 

1977 births
Living people
Footballers from San José, Costa Rica
Association football wingers
Costa Rican footballers
Costa Rica international footballers
2000 CONCACAF Gold Cup players
2001 Copa América players
2002 CONCACAF Gold Cup players
2002 FIFA World Cup players
2003 UNCAF Nations Cup players
2003 CONCACAF Gold Cup players
2004 Copa América players
2005 CONCACAF Gold Cup players
Deportivo Saprissa players
L.D. Alajuelense footballers
Anorthosis Famagusta F.C. players
OFI Crete F.C. players
Brujas FC players
C.D. Marathón players
F.C. Motagua players
C.F. Universidad de Costa Rica footballers
Brisbane Roar FC players
Costa Rican expatriate footballers
Expatriate soccer players in Australia
Expatriate footballers in Greece
Expatriate footballers in Cyprus
Expatriate footballers in Honduras
Costa Rican expatriate sportspeople in Australia
Costa Rican expatriate sportspeople in Greece
Costa Rican expatriate sportspeople in Cyprus
Costa Rican expatriate sportspeople in Honduras
Liga FPD players
Super League Greece players
A-League Men players
Liga Nacional de Fútbol Profesional de Honduras players
Cypriot First Division players
Copa Centroamericana-winning players
Central American Games gold medalists for Costa Rica
Central American Games medalists in football